The 1952 United States presidential election in Louisiana took place on November 4, 1952, as part of the 1952 United States presidential election. State voters chose 10 representatives, or electors, to the Electoral College, who voted for president and vice president.

Louisiana was won by Adlai Stevenson (D–Illinois), running with Senator John Sparkman, with 52.92% of the popular vote, against Dwight D. Eisenhower (R–New York), running with Senator Richard Nixon, with 47.08% of the popular vote. , this is the last election in which Ouachita Parish, Union Parish, and LaSalle Parish voted for a Democratic presidential candidate. This is the most recent election in which the Democratic nominee would carry the state without winning the presidency.

Results

Results by parish

See also
 United States presidential elections in Louisiana

References

Louisiana
1952
1952 Louisiana elections